Matthew Wesley Clair (October 21, 1865 – June 28, 1943) was one of the first African-American bishops in the Methodist Episcopal Church.

Biography
Matthew W. Clair was born in 1865 in Union, West Virginia. He was a son of Anthony and Ollie (Green) Clair, former slaves.

Clair and Robert E. Jones were appointed bishops of the Methodist Episcopal Church in 1920, becoming the first black people to receive that title. Clair was assigned to Monrovia, Liberia. Prior to his appointment, he served as District Superintendent for the Church in Washington, D.C.

In 1926, Bishop Clair was transferred to Covington, Kentucky. His territory included all of Kentucky and Tennessee. He would serve there until his retirement in 1936.

Bishop Clair and wife, Fannie, were the parents of two children:

 William O. Clair, born c. 1894
 John A. Clair, born c. 1903

Death

In June 1943, Bishop Clair travelled to Washington, D.C. to preside over the funeral of his brother. It was there that he died on June 28, 1943.

References
 Yenser, Thomas (editor), Who's Who in Colored America: A Biographical Dictionary of Notable Living Persons of African Descent in America, Who's Who in Colored America, Brooklyn, New York, 1930-1931-1932 (Third Edition)

See also
 List of bishops of the United Methodist Church

1865 births
Bishops of the Methodist Episcopal Church
American Methodist bishops
People from Union, West Virginia
1943 deaths
History of Methodism in the United States
African-American Methodist clergy
20th-century Methodist bishops
People from Monrovia
Methodists from West Virginia